Colonel Mahmud Salman (7 January 1889 – 5 May 1942) was the Commanding Officer in the Royal Iraqi Air Force in the late 1930s and as a member of the Golden Square, was one of the four principal instigators of the 1941 Iraqi coup d'état. Following the intervention of the British and the suppression of the coup, he was court-martialed and executed for treason. Followin

Salman was born in Baghdad in 1889 and as a young man served as an officer in the Ottoman, Syrian and Iraqi armies, the latter which he joined in 1925. In 1937, following the 1936 Iraqi coup d'état, when Bakr Sidqi became the de-facto ruler of Iraq and Commander of the Armed Forces, Salman was one of the small group of officers who planned the execution of Sidqi.

References

1889 births
1942 deaths
Golden Square members
Ottoman military personnel of World War I
Iraqi Air Force officers
People executed by Iraq by hanging

People who were court-martialed
Executed Iraqi collaborators with Nazi Germany